Sharnaaz Ahmad bin Basir Ahmad (born August 30, 1985) is a Malaysian actor, host, director and producer. He is a well-known character actor who always portrays anti-heroes and was nominated for several awards for his acting talent.

Personal life
Sharnaaz is the son of Datuk Basir Ahmad, a businessman in Penang. Basir was closely connected to the family of P. Ramlee. He participated in several bands during the 60s era of pop yeh yeh. Sharnaaz joined Prodigy Syndrome Management in 2010.

Career 
He debuted in 2009 with a small role in the drama series Tari Tirana, directed by Mohammed Shahrulezad. He appeared in the drama/comedy series K.I.T.A. directed by Michael Ang. He appeared in Dottie in 2010 and in the telefilm Ungunya Cinta.

He first played the lead in Seru, directed by Pierre Andre.

In early 2011, he appeared in the category Artists Popular New Male in Anugerah Bintang Popular Berita Harian 2010.

In 2013, he appeared in plays directed Michael Ang such as Kum Kum, Lagos Batu and Patah Seribu paired with Shila Amzah, his ex-girlfriend. He also appeared in dramas Ariana Mikhail, Bukan Bidadari.

He appeared in the film Juvana as a Lan Todak. In 2013, he played the husband in the telefilm Dibawah Langitmu with actress Nora Danish and competed in the category of Best Actor (Drama) Screen Awards . In the same event, he was nominated for Best Supporting Actor category (movies) through acting as Lan Swordfish in Juvana.

In 2014, he appeared in the 60 episode drama series titled Bukan Kerana Aku Tak Cinta .

Filmography

Film

Television series

Television movie

Television

Awards and nominations

References

External links
 
 
 

1985 births
Living people
Malaysian male actors
People from Penang
Malaysian people of Malay descent
Malaysian Muslims
Malaysian film actors
Malaysian male television actors